Mandeville Sports Centre is a sports ground and community park in Mandeville North, Canterbury, New Zealand. The park is home to 13 clubs facilitating archery, equestrian events, netball, rugby, tennis, cricket, dog clubs, bowls and squash. The ground held a single List A match in the 1990/91 Shell Cup when Canterbury played Wellington, which resulted in a 19 run victory for Wellington.  A number of other sports are played at the complex.

References

External links
Mandeville Sports Centre at ESPNcricinfo
Mandeville Sports Centre at CricketArchive

Cricket grounds in New Zealand
Sports venues in Canterbury, New Zealand
Waimakariri District